Jong Hak-Jin (born 22 December 1986) is a North Korean wrestler, winner of the world championships. He began the sport at age 11. He clinched the gold medal at the Wrestling Men's freestyle 51 kg event at the 2014 Asian Games.

References

1986 births
Living people
Asian Games medalists in wrestling
Wrestlers at the 2014 Asian Games
North Korean male sport wrestlers
Asian Games gold medalists for North Korea

Medalists at the 2014 Asian Games
Asian Wrestling Championships medalists
21st-century North Korean people